Under Australia's law, methamphetamine is a Schedule 8 drug, available for medical use but restricted in manufacture, supply, and possession. The drug is sought after by many in Australia to give oneself a ‘high’ or a ‘rush’ in their body. Methamphetamine has many names not only in Australia, but also around the world. These include Chalk, Crypto, Gear, Getgo, Tweak, and Cristy, although the two most common ones in Australia today are Speed and Ice. Users of this drug often feel senses of exhilaration and arousal as the brain is flooded with monoamines.

Methamphetamine was synthesized in Japan in 1893 from the drug ephedrine; and since then has changed into a variety of different forms. Australia has a drug scene which is increasing with the demand for drugs like methamphetamine since the start of 2000. As of April 2017, Australia has the highest methamphetamine addiction rate in the world.

History 
Methamphetamine was first synthesized in Japan by the chemist Nagai Nagayoshi; however, it did not come into prominent public view until the early 1990s when the Australian Federal Police (AFP) was warned of a new drug called "Ice" coming from overseas. During 1991, Hong Kong, Japan and Australia pooled their resources together to seize 80 kilograms of the methamphetamine drug which was believed to be manufactured in China.

Since the late 1990s, the amount of amphetamine type stimulants and crystal methamphetamine found by the Australian Customs has been increasing, to 1075 kilograms of amphetamine-type stimulants detected at the border in 2011, an increase from the 71 kilograms found in 1997. Today, the drug is in high demand all across Australia, and with this the authorities have been seizing large quantities on a regular basis.

During November 2014, the AFP successfully intercepted and seized Australia’s second largest drug bust which weighed in at 2.8 tonnes, which included 1.917 tonnes of MDMA and 849 kilograms of methamphetamine. This made the bust be the largest methamphetamine seizure and the second largest MDMA bust by the AFP since the first seizure in 1997.

In 2019 The Royal Australasian College of Physicians (RACP) and St Vincent Health Australia called on the NSW Government to publicly release the findings of the Special Commission of Inquiry into the Drug ‘Ice’, saying there was "no excuse" for the delay. The report was the culmination of months of evidence from health and judicial experts, as well as families and communities affected by  amphetamine-type substances across NSW. The report made 109 recommendations aimed to strengthen the NSW Governments response regarding amphetamine-based drugs such as crystal meth or ice. Major recommendations included more supervised drug use rooms, a prison needle and syringe exchange program, state-wide clinically supervised substance testing, including mobile pill testing at festivals, decriminalisation of drugs for personal use, a cease to the use of drug detection dogs at music festivals and to limit the use of strip searches. The report, also called for the NSW Government to adopt a comprehensive Drug and Alcohol policy, with the last drug and Alcohol policy expiring over a decade ago. The reports commissioner said the state's approach to drug use was profoundly flawed and said reform would require "political leadership and courage", "Criminalising use and possession encourages us to stigmatise people who use drugs as the authors of their own misfortunate," Mr Howard said current laws "allow us tacit permission to turn a blind eye to the factors driving most problematic drug use" including childhood abuse, domestic violence and mental illness. The NSW government rejected the reports key recommendations, saying it would consider the other remaining recommendations. Director of the Drug Policy Modelling Program (DPMP) at UNSW Sydney’s Social Policy Research Centre said the NSW Government has missed an opportunity to reform the state’s response to drugs based on evidence. The NSW Government is yet to officially respond to the inquiry as of November 2020, a statement was released from the government citing intention to respond by the end of 2020.

Legislation and policy (punishment) 

** Information in regards to selling and supply also,  possession of a classified substance is classed differently in each state. Some have small trafficable quantities, trafficable, large trafficable and commercial trafficable quantities as legislative policies. 

*** Intent to sell and supply comes under trafficking laws in some states in Australia depending upon the amount of prohibited substance.

Usage 

Between 2009 and 2010 there were 41,087 illicit drug offenses in Australia. Between 2013 and 2014 this number increased by over 25 percent to 50,854 drug offenses; furthermore, drug use increased from 22,842 to 28,409 over the same period of time. This portrays an increasing trend in the amount of drug use in Australia and drug offenses. However, since methamphetamine has become more available in the drug scene in Australia, it has developed and stronger forms of methamphetamine such as Crystal Methamphetamine has in turn increased in the usages over the past decade. In studies conducted by the Australian Government, between 1998 and 2010 there has been a slight decrease in the methamphetamine drug use in Australia; furthermore, between 2007 and 2010 methamphetamine use in males decreased from 9.8% to 6.8%. Since 2007, the trend has decreased in association to drug use with methamphetamine; however, after 2010 the trend according to the Australian Bureau of Statistics indicate an increase in drug use and drug offenses occurring in Australia.

As of April 2017, Australia has the highest methamphetamine addiction rate in the world.

In 2020 the Australian institute of Health & welfare published a report titled Alcohol, tobacco & other drugs in Australia, the report found Australia has the fourth highest average total stimulant consumption when compared with 29 countries across Europe, North America, Oceania, and South Africa. The report also found that there has been a rapid increase in the number of deaths involving methamphetamine and other stimulants, with the death rate in 2018 4 times higher than that in 1999 (1.7 deaths compared with 0.4 deaths per 100,000 population, respectively).a, there was a notable increase in hospital separations with methamphetamine drug-related principal diagnoses, rising from 3.1% of all drug-related principal diagnoses in 2013–14 to 7.6% in 2017–18 and that Amphetamines were a principal drug of concern for a client’s own drug use in 28% of closed treatment episodes, the second most common principal drug of concern behind alcohol (36%).

Risk groups 

Methamphetamine use is an increasing problem in Australia, as it becomes more readily available. In a study of injecting drug users, 53% of a group of 914 candidates reported that methamphetamine was their first drug injected into their bodies; however, the study continued to convey the point that it is a young adults' drug. During the last six months, 87% of injecting drug users under the age of 25 were reported to have used methamphetamine in the last 6 months, with 25 to 35-year-olds at 80% and 35 years and above at 74%.

The Australian Institute of Health and Welfare reported that males were more likely than females to use methamphetamine (8.2% to 5.9% respectively) and 20- to 29-year-olds were most likely to have used methamphetamine recently. The study also found, for people aged 14 years or older, the highest level of recent methamphetamine use was found among those who stated they were homosexual/bisexual (7.1%). Methamphetamine use was also high among unemployed people (4.8%), those who had never been married (3.8%) and single people without children (3.4%).

See also 

 Illicit drug use in Australia
 History and culture of substituted amphetamines

References 

Drugs in Australia
Australia